Rajiv Gandhi Government Engineering College Kangra is an engineering college located in Nagrota Bagwan, Himachal Pradesh, India.

Foundation 
The college was set up in the year 2014 under the Himachal Pradesh Technical University, Hamirpur. The college is one of the five government engineering colleges affiliated to the Himachal Pradesh Technical University.

Campus 

The college campus is situated in the town of Nagrota Bagwan of Kangra District in Himachal Pradesh and is located on the banks of a Singh Ravine a distuburary channel of Baner Ravine, surrounded by scenic hills of Kangra Valley. The distance to campus from Nagrota Bagwan bus terminus is 3 km and 2.5 km from Nagrota Railway Station.

Branches and Departments 
Rajiv Gandhi Government Engineering College currently has 5 departments which include the following :

Architecture

Civil Engineering 

Electrical Engineering 

Electronics and Communication Engineering 

Mechanical Engineering 

Apart from this the college also serves as a campus for HPTU-Business School and offers MBA courses as well.

Starting from 2017, it is also serving as a campus for HPTU-BHM and offers a course in Hotel Management.

Events

Annual Fest 
The  college celebrated its first ever Annual Fest in April 2017 after shifting to its original campus site. The two day event displayed several cultural activities by students and also featured performances by outside bands.

Techzion 
The Techzion is the Technical Fest of the college which took place for the first time in April 2017. It includes various technical events and exhibition of models made by students. 

The Technical as well as Cultural Fests are expected to be held around the same period of time in following years.

References

Engineering colleges in Himachal Pradesh
Education in Kangra district
Educational institutions established in 2014
2014 establishments in Himachal Pradesh
Memorials to Rajiv Gandhi